Throughout her acting career, Cher has mainly starred in comedy, drama, and romance films. She has appeared in eighteen films, including two as a cameo. She has also appeared in one starring theater role, one video game role, numerous television commercials and directed a piece of the motion picture If These Walls Could Talk in 1996 and some of her music videos of the Geffen-era in late 1980s and in early 1990s. Cher has starred in various international television commercials, as well as high-profile print advertising for Lori Davis (1992). Before she started her film career, she had a couple of hits in the 1960s, as a solo artist, and with her ex-husband Sonny Bono as the couple Sonny & Cher.

Her first appearance as an actress was in 1967 in the American television series The Man from U.N.C.L.E. as the model Ramona. That same year, she started her film career with Sonny Bono in the poorly received-film Good Times and later as a solo actress in the low budget feature Chastity. Since then she has starred in numerous independent and Hollywood motion pictures. She made her Broadway debut in Robert Altman's Come Back to the Five and Dime, Jimmy Dean, Jimmy Dean in 1982. The play was a critical and commercial success and Cher received strong reviews for her stage work (even Frank Rich called her "ingratiating") and paved the way for her to be cast in the film version the next year, that garnered her a Golden Globe nomination. She was next cast alongside Meryl Streep and Kurt Russell in the critically hailed drama Silkwood (1983) directed by Mike Nichols, inspired by the true-life story of Karen Silkwood, in which her character was a lesbian who worked in at the Kerr-McGee plant in Cimarron, Oklahoma. It was a commercial success and grossed $35 million in the United States alone. Cher then appeared in the drama Mask (1985) directed by Peter Bogdanovich and with Eric Stoltz, Sam Elliott and Laura Dern. The film is based on the life and early death of Roy L. "Rocky" Dennis, a boy who suffered from craniodiaphyseal dysplasia. The film was considered her first critical and commercial success as a leading actress and firmly established her as an actress. For her role as a mother of a severely disfigured boy, Cher won the Best Actress prize at the Cannes Film Festival.

In 1987, she starred in three films: the thriller Suspect, with Dennis Quaid and Liam Neeson; the film has been credited for the high quality of acting despite the severe loopholes of the story. In particular, Cher, in the lead role, has received positive reviews. The fantasy film The Witches of Eastwick, with Jack Nicholson, Susan Sarandon and Michelle Pfeiffer; and the romantic comedy Moonstruck with Nicolas Cage and Olympia Dukakis. Moonstruck is also her most commercial success to date, grossing over $80 million in the United States alone. During 1989–1991, Cher refused many roles, like The War of the Roses, Thelma & Louise and The Addams Family for starring in Richard Benjamin's Mermaids with Bob Hoskins, Winona Ryder, and a then 9-year-old Christina Ricci. The film was a modest success drawing only $35 million in tickets in the U.S. Cher made cameo appearances in the Robert Altman films The Player (1992) and Prêt-à-Porter (1994). She starred in the poorly received film Faithful (1996) with Ryan O'Neal and Chazz Palminteri, in the role of the betrayed wife. Then, in 1999, Cher co-starred in the well-received Franco Zeffirelli film Tea With Mussolini with Judi Dench, Maggie Smith, Joan Plowright and Lily Tomlin. Cher had a minor appearance in the Farrelly Brothers comedy Stuck on You (2003) with Matt Damon and Greg Kinnear, in which she plays herself and Honey, a character of a TV series. She also spoofed her own image, appearing in bed with a high school boyfriend (Frankie Muniz). In 2010, Cher appeared alongside pop singer Christina Aguilera in the Steven Antin directed musical film Burlesque, her last major starring movie role to date.

Cher has also contributed music to films, like "Alfie", "After All" "The Shoop Shoop Song (It's in His Kiss)" and "You Haven't Seen the Last of Me". Cher has received many awards and nominations for her work in films. She was nominated six times for the Golden Globe Awards, winning it three times; in 1974 for Best Actress – Television Series Musical or Comedy, in 1983 for Best Supporting Actress in a Drama for her role in Silkwood and in 1987 for Best Actress in a Comedy for her role in Moonstruck. She was also nominated twice for the Academy Award, in 1984 for her role in Silkwood, and in 1987, when she won the Best Actress award for her role in Moonstruck.

Film

Television

Video games

Commercials

Other work 
CherFitness: A New Attitude (1991) – Fitness video
CherFitness: Body Confidence (1992) – Fitness video
9: The Last Resort (1996) – Adventure computer game

Film roles associated with Cher

References
General

 
 
 
 

Specific

External links
 Official Cher site
 

Film
Actress filmographies
American filmographies